Shiv Sunder Das  (born 5 November 1977) is an Indian cricketer and 3rd player from Odisha to represent India. He is a right-handed opening batsman. In first-class cricket he played for Odisha. Das was selected in 2000 for the first intake of the National Cricket Academy in Bangalore. He proceeded to make his Test debut later that year.

International career 
Considered the answer to India's search for a genuine Test opener, Das was selected for the 2002 tour of West Indies but after failing to score a fifty during the tour, he was dropped from the Test XI in the subsequent tour of England, and has not played for India since.
Das represented India in 23 Test matches and scored 1,326 runs at an average of 34.89, hitting two centuries – both of them against Zimbabwe. He was awarded the Man of the Series award during this tour to Zimbabwe, in 2001. Das then hit 250 in a first-class match against Essex during India's tour to England in 2002. In first class cricket, Das now retired  in domestic competitions and currently batting coach of India national women cricket team

Coaching career 
Back in 2016, he was training the boys in the U-16 & U-19 camp in Dimapur and Shillong Before taking coach role for a senior side.
Shiv sunder Das was appointed as the coach of the Barbados cricket team by the West Indies Cricket Board in 2017.He replaced the former India cricketer Debasish Mohanty as the head  coached Barbados cricket team. 
In August 2018, he was appointed as the coach of Manipur cricket team. He was ruled out as National Selector due to the 'Retirement date' criteria because his retirement from all formats was not completed 5 years. In 2021, he has been named as the batting coach of the Indian women's team.

References

External links
 

Indian cricketers
1977 births
Living people
India One Day International cricketers
India Test cricketers
East Zone cricketers
Odisha cricketers
Vidarbha cricketers
Indian cricket coaches
Sportspeople from Bhubaneswar
Cricketers from Odisha